Coproduction Office, founded in 1987, is composed of four production divisions in Berlin, Paris, Copenhagen and London, and an international sales company, all specialised in Auteur Cinema. Coproduction Office’s founder Philippe Bober has produced forty films to date with twelve of these having been selected to screen in Competition in Cannes, winning two Golden Palms: Triangle of Sadness and The Square both by Ruben Östlund.

Over the last two decades, it has mainly produced and handled films by Ulrich Seidl, Jessica Hausner, Roy Andersson, Michelangelo Frammartino,  Kornél Mundruczó, Ilya Khrzhanovsky, Carlos Reygadas, Ruben Östlund, and has also sold films by, among others, Gust Van den Berghe, Takashi Miike, Antonio Campos, Cristi Puiu, Corneliu Porumboiu and Thomas Clay. 

As one of Europe’s leading international sales agents, Coproduction Office handles the international distribution of its films as well as a selection of other exceptional films, such as the meticulously restored masterpieces of Roberto Rossellini.

History 
Founded in 1987 by Philippe Bober, the company was named after its efforts to raise funds for Europa by Lars von Trier (winner of the Jury Prize at Cannes in 1991). Europa was a four-country coproduction supported by Eurimages during its very first session in 1989 for which Bober acted as associate producer for Germany and France. For von Trier's following project, The Kingdom, Coproduction Office was involved both as German co-producer and international sales agent, closing deals in territories where the four-hour-long television series was distributed theatrically (by October Films in the U.S.; ICA Projects in the United Kingdom; Haut et Cour in France; Shochiku in Japan, Key Films in Italy; Essential Films in Germany - the then newly created, Berlin-based production arm of Coproduction Office). Coproduction Office then went on to produce Breaking The Waves for the joint production venture Libérator Productions with Zentropa in 1999, and has established ongoing relationships with Scandinavian directors; Roy Andersson, Dagur Kári, producing the film Nói Albinóitogether with Iceland's Zik Zak Filmworks, as well as 
Ruben Östlund.

Coproduction Office expanded its production activities adding production divisions in Paris in 2000, in Copenhagen in 2007, and in London in 2020. Coproduction Office and the Sarajevo Film Festival have cooperated since 1995 with Philippe Bober being artistic director and thereafter programmer of the new currents section. "Having freedom of choice has always been an obsession of mine," notes Bober, highlighting that he "also spent three months per year for over 15 years viewing films, going to festivals, looking for information about directors: focusing on a few films is a deliberate choice and the result of this work." It is thanks to his role at the Sarajevo Festival that Philippe Bober invited Roy Andersson’s short films Something Happened (1987) and World of Glory (1991), as well as Jessica Hausner’s graduation film Inter-View (1999), Ulrich Seidl’s film Models (1999) and Ruben Östlund’s short film Autobiographical Scene Number 6882 (2005), subsequently establishing long working relationships with all four directors. “In the end, I’m loyal to auteurs” comments Philippe Bober, “I’ve been working with Michelangelo Frammartino since 2003, with Jessica Hausner and Ulrich Seidl since 1999, and with Roy Andersson since 1996. The auteurs and the company grow together."

Film Library 
The films produced or sold by Coproduction Office mostly premiered in Cannes (with 12 nominations in the official Competition, 8 first features and 13 awards across sections), Venice (with 6 nominations in the official Competition, 5 first features and 8 awards across sections) and Berlin (4 nominations in Competition). 21 of these Competition titles were produced or co-produced by Philippe Bober.

Awards 
Cannes Film Festival

 2022: Palme d'Or for Triangle of Sadness by Ruben Östlund
2019: Prix d'interprétation féminine – Best Actress for Little Joe by Jessica Hausner
 2017: Palme d'Or for The Square by Ruben Östlund
 2014: Jury Prize Un Certain Regard for Force Majeure by Ruben Östlund
 2008: Fipresci Award for Delta by Kornél Mundruczó
 2006: Camera d'Or and Prix Europa Cinema for 12:08 East of Bucharest by Corneliu Porumboiu
 2005: Prize Un Certain Regard Award for The Death of Mr. Lazarescu by Cristi Puiu
 2002: Camera d'Or Special Mention for Japón by Carlos Reygadas
 2000: Jury Prize for Songs from the Second Floor by Roy Andersson
 1999: Cinéfondation Award - Special Mention for Inter-view by Jessica Hausner
 1996: Grand Prix for Breaking the Waves by Lars Von Trier
 1992: Jury Prize for Europa by Lars von Trier
 Mostra Internazionale del Cinema di Venezia
 2019: Silver Lion for About Endlessness by Roy Andersson
2014: Golden Lion for A Pigeon Sat on a Branch Reflecting on Existence by Roy Andersson
 2012: Jury Prize for Paradise: Faith by Ulrich Seidl
 2009: Fipresci Award, Signis Award, Premio La Navicella and Brian Award for Lourdes by Jessica Hausner
 2009: Silver Lion for Women Without Men by Shirin Neshat
 2001: Grand Prix for Dog Days by Ulrich Seidl
 Berlin International Film Festival
 2020: Silver Bear for Outstanding Artistic Contribution for DAU.Natasha by Ilya Khrzhanovsky and Jekaterina Oertel
 Other main prizes:
 2015: Special Jury Award at South by Southwest for Creative Control by Benjamin Dickinson
 2010: Label Europa Cinemas for Le Quattro Volte by Michelangelo Frammartino
 2005: Tiger Award for 4 by Ilya Khrzhanovsky
 2002: Silver Leopard for Pleasant Days by Kornél Mundruczó
 2000: Tiger Award for Suzhou River by Lou Ye
 1999: Sarajevo Audience Award for Models by Ulrich Seidl
 1996: 6 Robert Awards for The Kingdom by Lars von Trier
 1990: Wiener Film Prize for Good News by Ulrich Seidl

The Rossellini Project 
In collaboration with Istituto Luce, Cineteca di Bologna and CSC Cineteca Nazionale, Coproduction Office undertakes the restoration and promotion of ten key films of Roberto Rossellini’s filmography:
 Rome, Open City (1945)
 Paisan (1946)
 Amore (1948)
 Germany, Year Zero (1948)
 Stromboli (1950)
 Machine to Kill Bad People (1952)
 Fear (1954)
 Journey to Italy (1954)
 India: Matri Bhumi (1959)
 Intervista a Salvador Allende: La forza e la ragione (1971)
 Anno Uno (1974)

Coproduction Office Classics and Restoration 

Coproduction Office is active in restoring its films, and whenever possible, working closely with the directors. 

In 2021, director Lou Ye supervised the Coproduction Office restoration of his film Suzhou River (2000), working from the original 16mm A-B negative of the image. The restored classic has been presented at Berlinale Classics 2022. 
Carlos Reygadas’ Battle in Heaven has been newly restored from the original negative, in full 4K resolution and with Dolby Atmos sound, this process was entirely supervised by the director. Of Reygadas’ titles Japòn, has been restored in 2K, as well as Post Tenebras Lux. 
Coproduction Office’s restoration efforts also extend to the Rossellini Collection.
 
Restoration of Dagur Kari and Jessica Hausner’s films is in process.

Filmography

References

External links 

Film production companies of France
International sales agents